Ravi Prakash Mahajan  of the Nottingham University Hospitals NHS Trust and Queen's Medical Centre, Nottingham, is president of the Royal College of Anaesthetists from September 2018.

He was appointed Commander of the Order of the British Empire (CBE) in the 2022 New Year Honours for services to anaesthesia.

References

External links 

Living people
Year of birth missing (living people)
Presidents of the Royal College of Anaesthetists
Fellows of the Royal College of Anaesthetists
Academics of the University of Nottingham
Commanders of the Order of the British Empire
British anaesthetists